Rachel Grady is an American documentary filmmaker.

She co-directed Jesus Camp (Academy Award nominee), The Boys of Baraka (Emmy nominee), 12th & Delaware (Peabody Award winner), DETROPIA (Emmy winner), Norman Lear: Just Another Version of You (2016 Sundance Film Festival), One of Us (2017 Toronto International Film Festival), and the Showtime docuseries, Love Fraud, which had its world premiere at the 2020 Sundance Film Festival and was nominated for an Independent Spirit Award. Grady also co-directed Endangered, a documentary for HBO on the threats faced by journalists around the world.

Biography
She is the stepdaughter of James Grady, author and investigative journalist. Grady was raised Jewish and still considers herself Jewish.

Career

Loki Films 
Many of Grady's prominent film projects have been co-directed and produced by her friend and business partner, Heidi Ewing. Meeting in 1997, Ewing and Grady found camaraderie in their similar approaches to creative projects. Soon thereafter, the two founded Loki Films in 2001, a production company that specializes in both short and feature films, as well as television and commercials.

Grady and Ewing approach their filmmaking with particular interest "in the nuances of the human experience and all of its colours and contours." Says Grady about her experience pursuing these interests: "we have found that in fundamentalist circles, you can learn a lot about human nature…you are asked to believe things that perhaps the majority of society doesn’t agree with".

Being a co-directing team, Grady and Ewing come up with an initial plan and outsource locations and subjects together. From there, the directors separate to conduct solo interviews and filming. When all the footage has been shot, the duo reconvenes to the editing room and compiles their respective material to create their desired film.

Film topics 
Specializing in documentary filmmaking, Grady and Ewing have tackled many controversial topics in their films although they reject the idea that they are "advocacy filmmakers" and say they prefer to have the subjects of their films guide the focus of their stories.

2006's Jesus Camp explores an evangelical Christian summer camp for children. Scholar Michael Friesen says that Jesus Camp raises "important questions about the children's psychological development in a milieu of strong religion". Following the release of the film, the camp was forced to close down after garnering negative attention from its portrayal in the film. Grady and Ewing have been accused of misrepresenting the evangelical Christian religion and approaching the film with an agenda.

Loki films' feature documentary One of Us debuted on Netflix in 2017. The film exposes many elements of Brooklyn's Hasidic Jewish community.

While developing the framework for One of Us, Grady said, "we started the film with what we always start all projects with, which is personal interest, curiosity". The film intimately deals with the themes of domestic and sexual abuse and the great lengths individuals must go to remove themselves from the community. Grady described the individuals who decided to leave their orthodox communities as "having an enormous amount of bravery and desperation".

Writer David Edelstein of Vulture said that Grady and Ewing did not attempt to make an "objective documentary" but noted the potential challenges that attempting to infiltrate the Hasidic community would pose even to obtain their side of the controversial stories.

Awards 
Jesus Camp premiered at the 2006 Tribeca Film Festival and was nominated for Best Documentary Feature at the 79thAcademy Awards.Detropia was placed on the shortlist for Best Documentary Feature at the 85th Academy Awards and One of Us garnered critical acclaim with a 96% rating on Rotten Tomatoes.

Filmography

References

External links

Living people
American Jews
Year of birth missing (living people)
American documentary film directors
The Field School alumni
American women documentary filmmakers
21st-century American women